Nora Lum (Chinese: 林家珍; pinyin: Lín Jiāzhēn), known professionally as Awkwafina, is an American actress, comedian, writer, producer, and rapper. In 2014, Awkwafina debuted as an actress from the third season of Girl Code. Before rising to prominence, she played supporting roles in the comedy films Neighbours 2: Sorority Rising (2016), Ocean's 8 (2018), and Jumanji: The Next Level (2019). In 2018, Awkwafina starred in Jon M. Chu's romantic-comedy Crazy Rich Asians. Her performance in the film was widely praised by the critics and audiences. Awkwafina, went on to win the Satellite Award for Best Actress – Motion Picture, and she was nominated for the Screen Actors Guild Award for Outstanding Performance by a Cast in a Motion Picture, MTV Movie Award for Best Comedic Performance, and MTV Movie Award for Best Breakthrough Performance.

In 2019, Awkwafina appeared in Lulu Wang's comedy-drama The Farewell. A film about a Chinese-American family who discover that their grandmother has only a short while left to live, they decide to not to tell her and schedule a family gathering before she dies. Her performance in the film was widely praised by the critics and she went on to win numerous accolades. Awkwafina won the Satellite Award for Best Actress – Motion Picture, Golden Globe Award for Best Actress – Motion Picture Comedy or Musical, Virtuoso Award from the Santa Barbara International Film Festival, and the Gotham Independent Film Award for Best Actress. She became the first woman of Asian descent to capture a Golden Globe in a lead actress film category after winning Best Actress – Motion Picture Comedy or Musical. In 2020, Awkwafina was nominated for the BAFTA Rising Star Award.

Awards and nominations

References

Footnotes

Citations

External links
 

Awkwafina